Kenneth George Plant (15 August 1925 – 22 March 2014) was an English professional footballer who played as a centre-forward in The Football League for Bury and Colchester United. Plant also made appearances for hometown club Nuneaton Borough and Atherstone Town in the non-leagues.

References

External links
 
 Ken Plant at Colchester United Archive Database

1925 births
2014 deaths
English footballers
Association football forwards
Nuneaton Borough F.C. players
Bury F.C. players
Colchester United F.C. players
Atherstone Town F.C. players